Volleyball at the Summer Paralympics was first held in 1976, when the traditional form of standing volleyball for men was contested and sitting volleyball for men was a demonstration sport. From 1980 through 2000, men's standing and sitting events were contested. The women's sitting volleyball event was introduced in 2004.

Medal summary

Men's

Sitting
Men's sitting volleyball medal winners for every Summer Games was as follows:

Standing
Men's standing volleyball medal winning for every Summer Games as follows:

Women's

Sitting
Women's sitting volleyball medal winning for every Summer Games as follows:

Medals ranking
 Both men's and women's sitting and standing volleyball medal results counted where applicable.

Nations 
Nations that took part in volleyball (both men and women).

Men 
Both sitting (1980 to present) and standing volleyball (1976 to 2000). Nations listed are their rankings during competition. (Key - sitting/standing, blank spaces are nations who didn't compete that year but did earlier or later.)

Women
Sitting volleyball competitions have only been contested by women since 2004 Summer Paralympics. Nations listed are their rankings during competition.

Multi-medalists 
Volleyball players who have won at least two gold medals. Athletes in bold are athletes who are still active.

See also 
Volleyball at the Summer Olympics

References 

 
Paralympics
Volleyball